Gustavo Espinoza Roman is a Peruvian politician and a former Congressman representing Lambayeque for the 2006–2011 term. Espinoza was originally elected to Congress, as a member of the Union for Peru party, but left it after the election due to differences with the party and later formed the Peruvian Democratic Party along with fellow Congress members Carlos Torres Caro and Rocío González. He was disqualified in March 2010 and was replaced by Martín Rivas Texeira of the Peruvian Nationalist Party.

External links
Official Congressional Site

Living people
Union for Peru politicians
Members of the Congress of the Republic of Peru
Peruvian Democratic Party politicians
Year of birth missing (living people)